The Bat & Ball Inn is a historic eighteenth-century pub near Clanfield, Hampshire, England. The earliest widely accepted written rules for the game of cricket were drafted at the pub.

History
The pub is situated opposite the Broadhalfpenny Down cricket ground, the original home of the Hambledon Club. Richard Nyren, a landlord of the inn from 1762 to 1772, was the Hambledon Club's team captain. Nyren was succeeded as landlord by William Barber, another well-known Hambledon cricketer, who held the licence until 1784.

The Monarch's Way long-distance footpath passes the pub.

The pub is currently owned by Fuller's and is a former George Gale and Co Ltd Pub. The pub has been Grade II listed since 1954.

References

Bibliography
 F S Ashley-Cooper, The Hambledon Cricket Chronicle, Herbert Jenkins, 1924 
 David Underdown, Start of Play, Allen Lane, 2000

Grade II listed pubs in Hampshire